Swingin' may refer to:

Music

Albums
 [[Swingin' (Dino album)|Swingin (Dino album)]]
 [[Swingin' (Arturo Sandoval album)|Swingin''' (Arturo Sandoval album)]]
 Swingin'  (Kenny Burrell album)
 Swingin, a 1984 Big Jay McNeely album of 1957-1961 recordings, and unreleased studio material
 Swingin'   Johnny Dorelli 2004/2007
 Swing'n, 1993 album by Hi-C

Songs
 "Swingin'", single by The Johnny Dankworth Seven, Parlophone 1953
 "Swingin'", single by jazz clarinetist Edmond Hall, Top Rank, 1960
 "Swingin'", single by Light of the World, Ensign, 1979
 "Swingin'" (John Anderson song) 1982 song, covered by Billy Jo Spears and LeAnn Rimes
 "Swingin'", a song by Tom Petty and the Heartbreakers from Echo "Swinging", 1981 single by New Zealand band The Swingers

See also
"Swangin", 2013 song by Stalley
Swing (disambiguation)Swinging with the Finkels'', a 2011 British film
Swinging (sexual practice)
Swinger (disambiguation)